Mandera is a town in the Maroodi Jeex province of Somaliland. Situated in the Hargeisa District, it is located northeast by road from Hargeisa and southwest of Berbera.

See also
Administrative divisions of Somaliland
Regions of Somaliland
Districts of Somaliland

References 

Google Maps (Map) Google.

https://www.mindat.org/loc-32221.html

Populated places in Maroodi Jeex